John Cooke (April 9, 1937 – December 26, 2005) was an American competition rower and Olympic champion.

He competed at the 1956 Summer Olympics in Melbourne, where he received a gold medal in eights with the American team.

References

External links

1937 births
2005 deaths
Olympic gold medalists for the United States in rowing
Rowers at the 1956 Summer Olympics
American male rowers
Medalists at the 1956 Summer Olympics